Verónica Villarroel González is a Chilean soprano. In 1989 she won the Metropolitan Opera National Council Auditions. She studied singing with Ellen Faull at the Juilliard School.

Villarroel was born in Santiago, Chile to Gueraldo Villarroel and Luisa González. She went to school at 'Instituto Anglo Chileno' (now 'Colegio Anglo Maipu') and then she studied publicity at university, but pursued a career in music in Santiago and then in New York. She was apprenticed to the opera diva, Renata Scotto while studying in the Juilliard School's Young Artist Program. Villarroel also has a younger sister, Maria Isabel (Maribel) Villarroel-Contador who is also a classical music singer. She currently teaches voice students in Santiago. 
In 2009 she sang at the "Festival de Viña del Mar" where she won all the prizes of the festival (silver torch, golden torch and silver seagull)

She debuted at the Metropolitan Opera in the role of Mimì in La Bohème in 1991 and sang that role twenty times. She sang there the role of Violetta in La Traviata in 1993 (19 times), the roles of Liù in Turandot and Micaela in Carmen in 1996, Marguerite in Faust in 1997, Lina in Stiffelio in 1998, Nedda in I Pagliacci and Margherita/Elena in Mefistofele in 1999, Cio-Cio-San in Madama Butterfly in 2001, Elizabeth of Valois in Don Carlo in 2002 and Luisa in Luisa Miller in 2006.

External links
Official site

Living people
Chilean operatic sopranos
Year of birth missing (living people)
Juilliard School alumni
Winners of the Metropolitan Opera National Council Auditions
20th-century women opera singers
21st-century women opera singers
Singers from Santiago
Voice teachers
Women music educators